The 1914 Milan–San Remo was the eighth edition of the Milan–San Remo cycle race and was held on 5 April 1914. The race started in Milan and finished in San Remo. The race was won by Ugo Agostoni.

General classification

References

1914
1914 in road cycling
1914 in Italian sport
April 1914 sports events